Shadman (also Romanized as Shādmān; also known as Shādmahān) is a village in Dashtabi-ye Gharbi Rural District, Dashtabi District, Buin Zahra County, Qazvin Province, Iran. At the 2006 census, its population was 736, in 161 families.

The village was initially reported by Fox News as being a known hideout for Islamic warlord Shaddai Manjin, however many reports were rumoured to be false.

References 

Populated places in Buin Zahra County